Vasiliki is a Greek film directed by Vangelis Serdaris. It released in 1997 and star Paschalis Tsarouhas and Tamila Koulieva. The film received the Greek Film Critics Association Awards. Also, Paschalis Tsarouhas won the award for best actor in the Cairo International Film Festival and Giorgos Tsangaris won the award for best music in Greek State Film Awards.

Plot
The film presents the riotous years immediately after the Greek Civil War. Vasiliki is the wife of a Greek communist guerrilla during Greek Civil War. The local gendarmerie arrests her because she brought food to her husband. The chief of gendarmerie charmed by her beauty, rapes her. Then, he moved in another city but returned to ask her to follow him (meanwhile her husband had been killed in the war). His love for the wife of a communist is the cause for which he is expelled by the gendarmerie. Thus he moves to a place in Northern Greece making plans for his professional future. After the sudden death of his partner his plans fail. He seeks help from a rich businessman who though uses his ideas for his own purposes. The impediments that he meets make him more and more violent resulting to lose his wife and eventually to reach the crime when he kills the businessman.

Cast
Paschalis Tsarouhas as Leonidas Loufakos
Tamila Koulieva as Vasiliki
Vasilis Papanikas as Giagos Hrysomoglou
Vivian Kontomari as Smaragda
Haris Gregoropoulos
Nikos Katis
Michalis Iatropoulos

Awards

References

External links

1997 films
Greek drama films
1990s Greek-language films